Wild and Free is the fourth solo studio album of Jamaican singer Ziggy Marley. The album was released on June 14, 2011. Wild and Free was produced by Don Was at Ocean Way Studios in Hollywood, California.

Background
In an interview with Billboard, Marley stated that the first single will be "Forward to Love" inspired by his wife Orly Marley. Marley concluded by saying, "I don't think I'm going to get enough time this year to really explore this album live," Marley notes, "so I'm looking for next year for it to be really about this album. I'll probably play this album more extensively live next year than this year, so it's looking like it's gonna be a two-year plan of touring with this one." Guest appearances on the album include actor Woody Harrelson on the title track, which was used for California's Proposition 19 campaign to legalize recreational marijuana, Heavy D on "It", and Marley's eldest son, Daniel, on "Changes".

Track listing
"Wild and Free" (featuring Woody Harrelson) – 4:50
"Forward to Love" – 3:43
"It" (featuring Heavy D) – 4:38
"Changes" (featuring Daniel Marley) – 4:07
"Personal Revolution" – 4:54
"Get out of Town" – 4:35
"Roads Less Traveled" – 4:03
"Mmmm Mmmm" – 3:31
"Welcome to the World" – 4:13
"A Sign" – 3:21
"Reggae in My Head" – 3:54
"Elizabeth" – 4:15

Personnel
Ziggy Marley - vocals, guitar, keyboards, percussion, backing vocals
Takeshi Akimoto - guitar
Darryl Jones - bass
James Poyser - keyboards
Carlton "Santa" Davis - drums
Rock Deadrick - percussion
Tracy Hazzard - backing vocals
Technical
 Produced by Don Was and Ziggy Marley
 Executive producer: Orly Marley
 Mixed by Bob Clearmountain at Mix This!
 Assisted by Brandon Duncan
 Mastered by Stephen Marcussen at Marcussen Mastering
 Recorded by Krish Sharma
 Additional engineering by Marc "Maka" Moreau
 Recorded at Ocean Way Studios and Barefoot Studios
 All words and music by David Marley; except:
"Changes": lyrics and music by David Marley and Linda Perry, additional lyrics by Daniel Marley
"Wild and Free": lyrics and music by David Marley, additional lyrics by Woody Harrelson
"It": lyrics and music by David Marley, additional lyrics by Heavy D
All songs published by Ishti Music (ASCAP)
Except:
"It"
Published by Ishti Music (ASCAP)
Soul on Soul Publishing (ASCAP)
"Changes"
Published by Stuck in the Throat Music / Sony / ATV Harmony (ASCAP)
Published by Ishti Music (ASCAP)
Published by Daniel Marley Music (ASCAP)
Art design and photography: Kii Arens

Charts

References

2011 albums
Ziggy Marley albums
Albums produced by Don Was